There's A Way may refer to:

There's a Way, album by Ron Sexsmith 1986,
"There's A Way", song by	Clive Shakespeare	1977
"There's A Way", song by Collective Soul from Youth (Collective Soul album)